Russell Gammon (6 May 1906 – 22 August 1968) was a Canadian rower. He competed in the men's coxless four event at the 1932 Summer Olympics.

References

1906 births
1968 deaths
Canadian male rowers
Olympic rowers of Canada
Rowers at the 1932 Summer Olympics
Sportspeople from Dartmouth, Nova Scotia